This is a list of all 101 of the ultra-prominent peaks (with topographic prominence greater than 1,500 metres) in West Asia. It includes peaks on the islands of Cyprus and Socotra. It also includes the 10 ultras of the Caucasus (also listed under Europe) as they are geographically more connected to the mountains of West Asia. Two of these peaks (Mount Aragats and Kapudzhukh Lerr) are on the Asian side of the ridge of the Greater Caucasus, which forms the boundary between Asia and Europe, and four more are on the border itself and so in both Europe and Asia.

List

See also
 List of Iranian four-thousanders

Sources
 List - Turkey
 List - Arabia
 List - Iran
 Map - Turkey & Iran
 Map - Arabia

Asia-related lists
West Asia Ultras
Geography of Western Asia
Middle East-related lists